International Security Research and Intelligence Agency (ISRIA) is a French company. It combines a private company, established in France in 2004, and an online media network with an international-level audience including policymakers, diplomats, and officials, providing news via diplomatic intelligence either for free or by charging a subscription fee.[failed verification] The company was founded in Paris in 2004.[better source needed] As of February 2009, the director of ISRIA is Charles Rault. (Charles Rault is an analyst specialized in non-conventional threats. He is the director of the International Security Research and Intelligence Agency (ISRIA), an information analysis and global intelligence company, and a Senior Adviser with the Athens-based Research Institute for European and American Studies (RIEAS). He has advised various state institutions and large companies in the assessment of current and future threats.)

History 
On 9 February 2009, ISRIA announced a subscription service called "Monitor Pack" to provide global security and intelligence news, consisting of "a combination of proprietary information and public domain information, chosen for maximum relevance" to support the government, military, and homeland security markets.

References 

Publications established in 2004